Jose Kurushinkal is a former Indian cricket umpire. He stood in three ODI games between 1994 and 1996.

See also
 List of One Day International cricket umpires

References

Year of birth missing (living people)
Living people
Indian One Day International cricket umpires
Place of birth missing (living people)